The 2022 Nova Scotia Scotties Tournament of Hearts, the provincial women's curling championship for Nova Scotia, was held from December 8 to 11, 2021 at the Berwick Curling Club in Berwick, Nova Scotia. The winning Christina Black team will represent Nova Scotia at the 2022 Scotties Tournament of Hearts in Thunder Bay, Ontario.

Unlike previous seasons, there was no preliminary round to qualify eight teams for the provincial championship. Any team was able to register to compete in the championship.

Teams
The teams are listed as follows:

Knockout brackets

Source:

A event

B event

C event

Knockout results
All draw times listed in Atlantic Time (UTC−04:00).

Draw 1
Wednesday, December 8, 2:00 pm

Draw 2
Wednesday, December 8, 7:30 pm

Draw 3
Thursday, December 9, 9:00 am

Draw 4
Thursday, December 9, 2:00 pm

Draw 5
Thursday, December 9, 7:00 pm

Draw 6
Friday, December 10, 2:00 pm

Draw 7
Friday, December 10, 7:00 pm

Draw 8
Saturday, December 11, 10:00 am

Draw 9
Saturday, December 11, 3:00 pm

Playoffs

No playoffs were required as the Christina Black rink won all three qualifying events.

Semifinal
Sunday, December 12, 10:00 am

Final
Sunday, December 12, 3:00 pm

References

2021 in Nova Scotia
Curling in Nova Scotia
2022 Scotties Tournament of Hearts
December 2021 sports events in Canada
Annapolis County, Nova Scotia